The Cleveland Bay is a breed of horse that originated in England during the 17th century, named after its colouring and the Cleveland district of Yorkshire. It is a well-muscled horse, with legs that are strong but short in relation to the body. The horses are always bay in colour, although a few light hairs in the mane and tail are characteristic of some breed lines. It is the oldest established horse breed in England. The ancestors of the breed were developed during the Middle Ages for use as pack horses, when they gained their nickname of "Chapman Horses". These pack horses were cross-bred with Andalusian and Barb blood, and later with Arabians and Thoroughbreds, to create the Cleveland Bay of today. Over the years, the breed became lighter in frame as they were employed more as carriage and riding horses. The popularity of the Cleveland Bay has greatly fluctuated since it was first imported to the United States in the early nineteenth century. Despite serious declines in the population after the Second World War, the breed has experienced a resurgence in popularity since the 1970s, although only around 550 horses existed worldwide as of 2006.

They have been patronized by members of the British Royal Family throughout their history, and they are still used to pull carriages in royal processions today. The breed has also been used to develop and improve several warmblood and draught horse breeds. Today they are used for farm work and driving, as well as under-saddle work. They are particularly popular for fox hunting and show jumping, both pure blooded and when crossed with Thoroughbreds. The Cleveland Bay is a rare breed, and both the United Kingdom-based Rare Breeds Survival Trust and the United States-based Livestock Conservancy consider the population to be at critical limits for extinction.

History

Originally developed in the Cleveland of Yorkshire, England, the Cleveland Bay is said to be the oldest established English horse breed, and the only horse native to Britain that does not belong to the heavy horse group. The closest breed in type, although completely unrelated, is the Irish Draught.

Development

The earliest breeding of the ancestors of the Cleveland Bay was done in large part by English churches and monasteries, to meet a need for pack horses to carry trade goods between abbeys and monasteries in northeast England. These medieval horses gained the nickname of "Chapman Horses" because of their use by travelling merchants known as "chapmen". What is now the Cleveland Bay was developed from Barb and Andalusian horses crossed with Chapman Horse mares. The Barb blood came mainly from horses imported by wealthy young men on their Grand Tour of Europe, bought off the docks in Marseilles and transported back to England. The Andalusian blood came from horses bred at the royal stud in Cordoba and given to English royalty by the King of Spain. The stallions were often available for breeding to local horses, and the first infusion of Andalusian blood was added to the native Chapman Horses. The Spanish horses also made their way to the outlying estates of English nobility, and were then taken by Oliver Cromwell's men after the English Civil War. Once in the hands of Cromwell's men, many of the stallions were made available for locals to cross with the existing Chapman Horses, adding a second infusion of Andalusian bloodlines. In the late seventeenth century a second infusion of Barb blood was added when Cleveland breeders purchased horses directly from soldiers at Tangier or from the Moors themselves.

Between 1685 and 1785 this Chapman Horse/Andalusian/Barb cross developed into the original Cleveland Bay. During this century the type grew bigger due to better feeding, and by 1785 had developed through selective breeding into the "agricultural type" Cleveland Bay. This original type was heavier and more draft-like than the breed of today. This was due to a need for strength more than speed on the farms and poor roads of 17th- and 18th-century England. As roads improved and speed became more important in the late eighteenth century, Thoroughbred and Arabian blood was added. The resulting horses were used extensively as coach horses, and were lighter of frame, with a well-arched neck and powerful shoulders, making for a flashy carriage horse. The Thoroughbred blood was added despite the claims of breeders that the Cleveland Bay was "free from taint of black or blood", meaning either Thoroughbred "blood" or the Old English "Black" and its descendants. The addition of Thoroughbred breeding is thought responsible for Cleveland Bays born with red legs (as opposed to the black normally associated with bay horses), generally the result of a chestnut Thoroughbred sire in the family tree.

Establishment

The British Cleveland Bay Horse Society was formed in 1883, and the first stud book was published in 1884. The nineteenth century saw the export of many Cleveland Bays overseas, to Australia, New Zealand, South Africa, the United States, India, Russia and the European continent. In the early nineteenth century, Cleveland Bays were first imported to Maryland, Virginia and Massachusetts in the United States, and in 1884 the Upperville Colt & Horse Show was created in Virginia by Colonel Richard Henry Dulany to showcase his imported Cleveland Bay stallion and the offspring of the stallion. The Cleveland Bay Society of America was formed in 1885, and the stud book began publication in 1889, although horses were registered who had lived as far back as 1860. Judging from the descriptions of the earliest registered horses, it is possible that many of the "Cleveland Bays" registered were actually Yorkshire Coach Horses; however, all were registered as Clevelands, and that is what they are known as today. Over 2,000 horses were registered with the association by 1907. The horses were of interest to Buffalo Bill Cody, who drove four Cleveland Bay stallions in his Wild West Show.

Before the First World War, having seen the cavalry feats of mounted Boers during the Second Boer War, Britain increased its cavalry reserves. Smaller Cleveland Bays were used to carry British troopers, and larger ones pulled artillery; the War Office offered premiums on Cleveland Bay stallions. Although the First World War was not the cavalry war that had been expected, large numbers of horses were used to pull artillery and losses were high. Because the war caused a depletion in stock, in 1920 and 1921, the British society opened a special register for previously unregistered mares of Cleveland Bay type, including some already registered as Yorkshire Coach Horses (a Cleveland/Thoroughbred cross), subject to inspection. Foals of these mares were eligible for registration in the main stud-book, and were also eligible to compete in breed competitions. Some of them were bred and owned by King George V.

Decline and re-emergence

However, interest in the Cleveland Bay was waning, due to increased mechanisation, and the Great Depression of the early 1930s reduced exports by almost a third. There was a brief revival of interest in the late 1930s in the United States when they became popular as foundation stock for hunters. The decline continued, quickening after the Second World War; in 1960 the War Office stopped offering premiums on stallions, and many breeders discontinued breeding. By 1962, only four purebred stallions were present in the UK. Queen Elizabeth II saved the breed by purchasing Mulgrave Supreme, a stallion that was about to be sold to a buyer in the United States. The stallion was bred to pure- and part-bred mares, and within 15 years there were 36 purebred stallions in the UK. Prince Philip, Duke of Edinburgh, used the breed for many years in international driving competitions. In the late 1960s and 1970s, interest in the breed increased, and part-bred Cleveland Bays were in demand for use as riding horses, especially for use as hunters and jumpers. In 1964, a Cleveland Bay/Thoroughbred cross competed in show jumping in the Tokyo Olympics. Another half-bred Cleveland Bay competed for the British Olympic team in show jumping at the 1968 Mexico City Olympics, while a third was a reserve mount for the Canadian show jumping team at the 1976 Montreal Olympics. In the late 1960s and '70s, horses continued to be exported to many countries. Japan, the United States and Australia have continued to import the horses from England, and in New Zealand crosses between Cleveland Bays and native mares were in demand on cattle and sheep stations.

Since 1977, Elizabeth II has been a patron of the Society, and during the Society's centenary year of 1984 she acted as its president. The Cleveland Bay Horse Society keeps a separate register for part-bred horses. In the late twentieth century, the breed again gained the attention of the United States public, and in 1985 the US association was reactivated, renamed the Cleveland Bay Society of North America. The US American Livestock Breeds Conservancy considers their status to be critical, which means there is an estimated global population of less than 2,000, and fewer than 200 annual registrations in the United States. The UK Rare Breeds Survival Trust also considers their status to be critical, with less than 300 breeding females registered worldwide. The Equus Survival Trust also considers the breed population to be at critical levels, meaning there are between 100 and 300 breeding females left in the world. About 135 purebred horses are registered in the US and Canada. There are also small populations in Japan, New Zealand, and Australia. In 2006, an estimated 550 Cleveland Bay horses existed worldwide, of which about 220 were mares; the 2005 foal crop produced fewer than 50 horses.

Characteristics

Bright bay horses (bays with a more reddish tint than normal) are the most preferred by breeders, followed by ordinary bay, dark bay and then light bay. This preference for brighter shades of bay was originally stated in the official breed standard, although this stipulation has since been removed. In some bloodlines of the breed, light, grayish hairs in the mane and tail are known as a characteristic of pure blood. White markings, except for a small star on the forehead, render the horse inadmissible to the stud book. Horses are expected to have complete black points, including completely black lower legs. Legs that are red below the knees and hocks are considered faulty in colour, although they do not disqualify a horse from registration. The occasional red legs that appear in the breed are thought to come from chestnut Thoroughbred stallions that were crossed into Cleveland Bay and Yorkshire Coach Horse bloodlines at some points in the history of both breeds. The uniformity in colour is encouraged as it makes creating matching driving teams and pairs very easy. When the breed was first developed, the horses almost always had a countershaded dorsal stripe, but these disappeared with the outcrossings of the eighteenth century.

The breed has a large head, slightly convex profile, and a long, well-muscled neck. The withers are well muscled, which often makes them less pronounced, the chest is broad and deep, the shoulders are muscular and sloping, and the croup slightly sloping. The legs are short in relation to the body, but strong and well muscled. The legs have little or no feather, as the breed was developed partially for working in the heavy clay soils of its native country, where heavy feather led to increased disease prevalence. They are hardy and long-lived horses, and docile in temperament. In the early twentieth century, when a breed standard was issued by the British Cleveland Bay Society for use in judging shows, a section was added on the movement of the horses, describing the desired action, especially at the trot. This was included in part because military potential was still considered a factor in evaluating harness horses and a good trot was necessary for an artillery horse. It was also evaluated because breeds with large action at the trot often also have a potential for jumping. The combination of desired characteristics means that the breed is useful for breeding show jumpers, eventers and steeplechasers (the latter especially when crossed with Thoroughbreds).

Part-bred horses can be registered under certain conditions. A horse with at least one grandparent may be registered in the UK stud-book. The Australasian society refers to part-breds as Sporthorses; they require at least 25 percent Cleveland Bay blood.

Uses

The Cleveland Bay is a versatile horse and is still used today for many tasks, including driving and farmwork. In the 1920s, Cleveland Bays replaced black Hanoverians in the British royal stables, and both the Cleveland Bay and Cleveland Bay/Thoroughbred crosses are used as royal carriage horses today. The horses are used as heavy hunters, as they are powerful and able to carry a man weighing  for a full day of hunting over large obstacles and through heavy clay. When crossed with Thoroughbreds, the resulting progeny are lighter and faster, but still strong and heavy of bone. When show jumping was first beginning as a sport during the mid-nineteenth century, Cleveland Bays were among the initial stars. Two mares, Star and Fanny Drape, were two of the top performers. Fanny Drape was known to have cleared a  stone wall with a rider on her back, and a  bar while being jumped in-hand. In 2006, a Cleveland Bay stallion named Tregoyd Journeyman was used as a model for a new horse figure by Breyer Animal Creations, and the stallion participated in that year's Breyer model horse festival. Purebred and crossbred Cleveland Bays make up the majority of the bay horses in the Royal Mews, the British royal stables, where they receive intense training to desensitize them before they are put to work drawing royal carriages.

The Cleveland Bay was used in the creation of the Oldenburg breed, because of its stamina, strength, and jumping ability. The breed was also used to create and improve the Holstein and Hanoverian breeds. In the late eighteenth century, the Cleveland Bay was used to create the short-lived Yorkshire Coach Horse through crosses with Thoroughbreds. These Yorkshires were used mainly to pull mail and passenger coaches, hence their name. Called by some the "New Cleveland Bay", foreigners often could not distinguish between the two breeds, and many horses registered as Cleveland Bays in European coach horse studbooks were actually Yorkshire Coach Horses. In the nineteenth century, the Cleveland Bay was crossed with French and Belgian draft horses to create the Vladimir Heavy Draft, a Russian breed developed to fill that country's need for a heavy draft breed.

Notes

References

External links

 Cleveland Bay Horse Society
 Cleveland Bay Horse Society of North America
 Cleveland Bay Horse Society of Australasia

Horse breeds
Horse breeds originating in England
Conservation Priority Breeds of the Livestock Conservancy
Animal breeds on the RBST Watchlist